Buffet is a surname of French origin. People with the surname include:
 The Buffet family of musical instrument makers
 Bernard Buffet (1928–1999), a French painter
 Louis Buffet (1818–1898), a 19th-century French statesman
 Marie-George Buffet (born 1949), a French politician
 Yannick Buffet (born 1979), a French ski mountaineer

See also
 Buffett